Marie Redonnet is the nom de plume of Martine L'hospitalier (born 1948, Paris) who is a French writer of poems, novels, essays, short stories, and plays. Her works have been translated into eleven languages.

Biography
Martine L'hospitalier was born in 1948, her mother's birth name was Redonnet. She studied literature, particularly Jean Genet, and she became a teacher and began writing in the late 1970s. Her first published work was  Le Mort & Cie, a collection of poems released in 1985. The following year, she published a collection of short stories entitled Doublures. She followed that with a trilogy of novels: Splendid Hôtel (1986), Forever Valley, and Rose Mélie Rose (1987).

Redonnet has taught at the Université de la Sorbonne-Nouvelle. From 1995 to 1997, she was responsible for the research of art and language at the Centre national de la recherche scientifique. From 2000 to 2004, she was an advisor for literature at the French embassy in Morocco.

Her books are written in sparse prose that some have compared to Samuel Beckett,

Redonnet and her son are based in Morocco.

Selected works

Novels 
 Candy Story (1992)
 Nevermore (1994)
 Diego (2005)

Short stories 
 Silsie (1990)

Plays 
 Tir & Lir (1988)
 Mobie-Diq (1989)
 Seaside (1991)
 Le Cirque Pandor and Fort Gambo (1991)

References 

1948 births
Living people
French women poets
French women novelists
French women dramatists and playwrights
French women short story writers
French short story writers
Writers from Paris
Academic staff of the University of Paris
20th-century French novelists
20th-century French dramatists and playwrights
20th-century French women writers
20th-century French poets
20th-century short story writers